The following is the qualification system and qualified athletes for the boxing at the 2023 Pan American Games competitions.

Qualification system
A total of 130 boxers will qualify to compete at the games (ten per event). The host nation (Chile) received automatic qualification spots. The remainder of the spots were awarded through various qualifying tournaments.

Qualification timeline

Qualification summary
The following is a summary of qualified countries per event.

Men

51 kg

57 kg

63.5 kg

71 kg

80 kg

92 kg

+92 kg

Women

50 kg

54 kg

57 kg

60 kg

66 kg

75 kg

References

P
Qualification for the 2023 Pan American Games
Boxing at the 2023 Pan American Games